The 3rd Aerobic Gymnastics World Championships were held in Perth, Western Australia, in 1997.

Results

Men's Individual

Women's Individual

Mixed Pair

Trio

Medal table

References 
 http://www.ueg-gymnastics.com/commstore/commstore2.pl/3dcbc434dc0bd5eb/en/statistics.html?k=236037&block_id=head,P3,content&P1=55&P2=55&P3=statistics&P4=6&P10=55&P9=236037

Aerobic Gymnastics World Championships
Aerobic Gymnastics World Championships
Aerobic Gymnastics World Championships
Sport in Perth, Western Australia
International gymnastics competitions hosted by Australia